Joannes Corvus (fl. 1512 – 1544), or Johannes Corvus, was a Flemish portrait painter who was active in the 16th century.

Biography
Corvus has been identified with Jan Rave, a native of Bruges, received master in that town in 1512, who subsequently came to England, and, like many of his fellow-countrymen, Latinised his name.

George Vertue was the first to discover his existence, finding the inscription Joannes Corvus Flandrus faciebat on the frame of a portrait of Bishop Fox, the founder, at Corpus Christi College, Oxford, which he engraved for Richard Fiddes's Life of Cardinal Wolsey. In 1820 this portrait was placed in a new and gorgeous frame, and the old frame was destroyed. Vertue's statement is authenticated by the existence of a portrait of Mary Tudor, the daughter of Henry VII, which has a frame and inscription similar to that of Bishop Fox, as described by Vertue. This picture, after being restored extensively, was in the possession of the Des Vœux family, and subsequently in the Dent collection. In this portrait there is a groundwork of gold showing through the colour of the dress, which is painted over it. This suggested that the portrait of Princess Mary Tudor in the National Portrait Gallery (dated 1544) is the work of Corvus, and it might be identified with an entry in the Privy Purse Expenses of the Princess Mary (edited by Sir F. Madden). The portrait of Henry Grey, duke of Suffolk, in the same collection, has for similar reasons been ascribed to Corvus.

Gallery

References

Attribution

External links

Year of birth unknown
Year of death unknown
16th-century Flemish painters
Portrait painters
Artists from Bruges